1-Heptadecanol  or heptadecyl alcohol is a saturated fatty alcohol with the CAS number 1454-85-9.

References 

Fatty alcohols
Alkanols
Primary alcohols